The 1968 Masters Tournament was the 32nd Masters Tournament, held April 11–14 at Augusta National Golf Club in Augusta, Georgia.

Bob Goalby won his only major championship, one stroke ahead of Roberto De Vicenzo, the reigning British Open champion. On the back nine in the final round, Goalby birdied 13 and 14 and eagled 15 to record a 66 (−6) and a total of 277 (−11).

At first it appeared that he had tied De Vicenzo and the two would meet in an 18-hole Monday playoff, but De Vicenzo returned an incorrect scorecard showing a par 4 on the 17th hole, instead of a birdie 3, sunk with a two-foot putt. Playing partner Tommy Aaron incorrectly marked the 4 and De Vicenzo failed to catch the mistake and signed the scorecard. USGA rules stated that the higher written score signed by a golfer on his card must stand, and the error gave Goalby the championship.

Speaking to the press after the error, De Vincenzo said, "What a stupid I am."

Ironically, Goalby discovered a scoring error he had made on the card he was keeping for Raymond Floyd, his playing partner in the final round, which he corrected at the scorer's tent. He had marked Floyd down for a par-3 on the 16th hole, when Floyd had actually bogeyed the hole. Floyd ended up in a tie for seventh place with, among others, Aaron. Both Aaron and Floyd would win the Masters in future years, Aaron in 1973 and Floyd in 1976.

Jack Nicklaus tied for fifth place and third-round leader Gary Player finished tied for seventh. Lee Trevino, 28, made his Masters debut and was two strokes back after three rounds, tied for seventh place. A rough back nine of 43 (+7) pushed his score to 80 and he finished tied for 40th. Two months later, he won the 1968 U.S. Open, the first of his six major titles. The Masters was the only major that eluded him; his best finish was a tie for tenth, in 1975 and 1985. Citing incompatibility, Trevino skipped Augusta three times in the early 1970s, and missed in 1977 due to a bad back.

In his fourteenth Masters at age 38, four-time champion Arnold Palmer found the water three times during a second round 79 for 151 and missed the cut for the first time at Augusta. He made the next seven cuts, through 1975.

Bob Rosburg won the ninth Par 3 contest on Wednesday with a score of 22. Claude Harmon, 51, had consecutive aces at the fourth and fifth holes, but tied for third at 24. The next day, Harmon withdrew in the first round after a nine-hole score of 40.

Course

^ Holes 1, 2, 4, and 11 were later renamed.

Field
1. Masters champions
Gay Brewer (8,11), Jack Burke Jr., Doug Ford, Ralph Guldahl, Claude Harmon, Herman Keiser, Cary Middlecoff, Jack Nicklaus (2,3,4,9,10), Arnold Palmer (8,9,11), Henry Picard, Gary Player (2,8,9), Sam Snead (8), Art Wall Jr. (9)
Jimmy Demaret, Ben Hogan (8), Byron Nelson, Gene Sarazen, and Craig Wood did not play.

The following categories only apply to Americans

2. U.S. Open champions (last five years)
Julius Boros (8,10,11), Billy Casper (8,9,11), Ken Venturi (8)

3. The Open champions (last five years)

4. PGA champions (last five years)
Al Geiberger (10,11), Don January (9,10), Dave Marr (8,9), Bobby Nichols (8,11)

5. The first eight finishers in the 1967 U.S. Amateur
Vinny Giles (a), William C. Campbell (7,a), Downing Gray (7,a), Doug Olson (a)

Ron Cerrudo (7), Bob Dickson (6,7), Marty Fleckman (7), and Bob Murphy (7) forfeited their exemptions by turning professional.

6. Previous two U.S. Amateur and Amateur champions

7. Members of the 1967 U.S. Walker Cup team
Jack Lewis Jr. (a), Ed Tutwiler (a)

Don Allen (a) declined his invitation because of the birth of his first child. Jimmy Grant  forfeited his exemption by turning professional.

8. Top 24 players and ties from the 1967 Masters Tournament
Tommy Aaron, George Archer, Jacky Cupit, Wes Ellis (9), Paul Harney, Jay Hebert, Lionel Hebert, Bob Rosburg, Mason Rudolph, Doug Sanders (11), Bert Yancey

9. Top 16 players and ties from the 1967 U.S. Open
Deane Beman, Gardner Dickinson (11), Bob Goalby (10), Dutch Harrison, Jerry Pittman, Lee Trevino, Tom Weiskopf

10. Top eight players and ties from 1967 PGA Championship
Frank Beard, Don Bies, Gene Littler (11), Don Massengale, Dan Sikes

11. Members of the U.S. 1967 Ryder Cup team
Johnny Pott

12. One player, either amateur or professional, not already qualified, selected by a ballot of ex-Masters champions.
Tommy Jacobs

13. Leading six players, not already qualified, from a points list based on finishes in PGA Tour events since the previous Masters
Miller Barber, Charles Coody, Raymond Floyd, Dave Hill, R. H. Sikes, Kermit Zarley

14. Foreign invitations
Al Balding (9), Peter Butler (8), Joe Carr (a), Bob Charles (3), Chen Ching-Po, Clive Clark, Gary Cowan (6,a), Roberto De Vicenzo (3,8), Bruce Devlin (8), Malcolm Gregson, Harold Henning, Tommy Horton, Tony Jacklin (8), George Knudson, Kel Nagle (9), Hideyo Sugimoto, Raul Travieso

Numbers in brackets indicate categories that the player would have qualified under had they been American.

Round summaries

First round
Thursday, April 11, 1968

Source:

Second round
Friday, April 12, 1968

Source:

Third round
Saturday, April 13, 1968

Source:

Final round
Sunday, April 14, 1968

Final leaderboard

Sources:

Scorecard

^ De Vicenzo actually birdied the 17th hole, but signed for a par on his scorecard.

Cumulative tournament scores, relative to par

References

External links
Masters.com – past winners and results
Augusta.com – 1968 Masters leaderboard and scorecards

1968
1968 in golf
1968 in American sports
1968 in sports in Georgia (U.S. state)
April 1968 sports events in the United States